The following railroads operate in the U.S. state of Mississippi.

Common freight carriers
Alabama and Gulf Coast Railway (AGR)
Alabama Southern Railroad (ABS)
BNSF Railway (BNSF)
Canadian National Railway (CN) through subsidiary Illinois Central Railroad (IC)
Columbus and Greenville Railway (CAGY)
CSX Transportation (CSXT
Golden Triangle Railroad (GTRA)
Grenada Railway (GRYR)
Kansas City Southern Railway (KCS)
Luxapalila Valley Railroad (LXVR)
M&B Railroad (MNBR)
Meridian Southern Railway (MDS)
Mississippi Central Railroad (MSCI)
Mississippi Delta Railroad (MSDR)
Mississippi Export Railroad (MSE)
Mississippi Southern Railroad (MSR)
Mississippian Railway (MSRW)
Natchez Railway (NTZR)
Norfolk Southern Railway (NS) including subsidiary Alabama Great Southern Railroad (AGS)
Old Augusta Railroad (OAR)
Port Bienville Railroad (PBVR)
Ripley and New Albany Railroad (RNA)
R.J. Corman Railroad/Tennessee Terminal (RJCK)
Vicksburg Southern Railroad (VSOR)
West Tennessee Railroad (WTNN)

Passenger carriers
Amtrak (AMTK)

Defunct railroads

Private freight carriers
Albertson Great Eastern Railroad
Champion Lumber Company
Epps and Northwestern Railroad
Laurel and Northwestern Railroad
Laurel and Tallahoma Western Railway

Electric
Biloxi Electric Railway and Power Company
Gulfport and Mississippi Coast Traction Company
Hattiesburg Traction Company
Jackson Railway and Light Company
Jackson Light and Traction Company
Meridian Light and Railway Company
Meridian Street Railway and Power Company
Pascagoula Street Railway and Power Company
Southern Railway and Light Company
Southern Light and Traction Company
Vicksburg Railway and Light Company
Vicksburg Light and Traction Company
Vicksburg Traction Company

Notes

References

Mississippi DOT railroad map (PDF)
Mississippi Rails

 
 
Mississippi
Railroads